Tobechytske Lake  (Russian: Тобечи́кское о́зеро, Ukrainian: Тобечикське озеро, Crimean Tatar: Тöbeçik gölü) is a salt lake in the south of the Kerch Peninsula in the Lenine Raion district of Crimea. The lake belongs to the Kerch group of lakes.

The villages of Ohon'ky and Chelyadinove are located to the north of the lake, Kostyrine to the south, and the city of Kerch to the north-east.

References 

Lakes of Crimea
Lakes of Ukraine